The Tiangong Space Station is a Chinese space station in low Earth orbit, and is operated by the China Manned Space Agency. Extravehicular activities are crucial for both the construction and maintenance of the station. Zhai Zhigang completed the first Chinese spacewalk in 2008, during the Shenzhou 7 mission. Since then, every other Chinese spacewalk has been carried out at the Tiangong Space Station.

List 
*denotes spacewalks performed from the Tianhe core module

^denotes spacewalks performed from the Wentian module

References 

Spaceflight timelines
Tiangong program